Ramalingam "Rama" Chellappa is a Bloomberg Distinguished Professor, who works at Johns Hopkins University. He is the Chief Scientist of The Johns Hopkins Institute for Assured Autonomy, and joined Johns Hopkins University after 29 years at The University of Maryland. Before that, he was an assistant, associate professor, and later, director, of the University of Southern California's Signal and Image Processing institute.

Ramalingam was born near Chennai, in Southern India.

Education 
Ramalingam received his PhD of Electrical Engineering at Purdue University, as well as his MSEE. He has a Master of Engineering (Distinction) of Electrical and Communication Engineering from The Indian Institute of Science (1977), and a Bachelor of Engineering (Honors) of Electrical and Communication Engineering from The University of Madras (1975).

Work at The University of Southern California 
During Ramalingam's time at the University of Southern California, he was worked at the Signal and Image Processing institute, as an assistant from 1981 to 1986, associate professor during 1986 to 1991, and director during 1988 to 1990.

Work at The University of Maryland 
During his time at The University of Maryland, Ramalingam Chellappa was a professor of The Department of Electrical and Computer Engineering, as well as an affiliate professor at The Department of Computer Science.

Work at Johns Hopkins University 
Ramalingam currently works at Johns Hopkins University, and is researching artificial intelligence, facial recognition, machine learning, motion capture, and computer imaging.

He is a Life Fellow of IEEE, President of the IEEE Biometrics Council, a distinguished lecturer of the IEEE Signal Processing Society, and holds 8 patents.

Awards 

 IEEE Jack S. Kilby Signal Processing Medal (2020 Recipient)
 IEEE Signal Processing Society Award
 NSF Presidential Young Investigator Award
 IBM Faculty Development Award (4 in total)
 International Association for Pattern Recognition Paper Award (2 in total)
 IEEE Computer Society Technical Achievement and Meritorious Service Awards
 Office of Technology Commercialization Outstanding Innovator Award

Publications 
Chellappa has published more than 100 peer-reviewed articles in top journals. He has an h-index of 137.

 Pubmed citations
 Google Scholar citations

Books 

 Can We Trust AI?, Johns Hopkins University Press 2022

Highly Cited Articles 

 2003, W Zhao, R Chellappa, PJ Phillips, A Rosenfeld, Face Recognition: A Literature Survey, in ACM Computing Surveys (CSUR). Vol. 35 nº4, 399-458.
 1995, R Chellappa, CL Wilson, S Sirohey, Human and Machine Recognition of Faces: A Survey, in Proceedings of the IEEE. Vol. 83, nº5, 705-741.
 2008, P Turaga, R Chellappa, VS Subrahmanian, O Udrea, Machine Recognition of Human Activities: A Survey, in IEEE Transactions on Circuits and Systems for Video Technology. Vol. 18 nº11, 1473-1488.
 1997, K Etemad, R Chellappa, Discriminant Analysis for Recognition of Human Face Images, in Journal of the Optical Society of America. Vol. 14 nº8, 1724-1733.

References 

Living people
Year of birth missing (living people)
University of Madras alumni
Purdue University alumni
Indian Institute of Science alumni
Fellow Members of the IEEE
University of Southern California alumni
University of Maryland, College Park faculty
Scientists from Chennai
Indian expatriates in the United States
Electrical engineering academics
Indian expatriate academics
Indian electrical engineers